The Jiotto Caspita is a prototype mid-engine sports car designed and manufactured by Dome in 1989. The car was billed as the "F1 on the Road." The original design of the car was done by Kunihisa Ito, who was the vice president and chief designer of Jiotto Design Incorporated. Its name is derived from the Italian exclamation "caspita".

History 
The Caspita was the brainchild of Wacoal president Yoshikata Tsukamoto and Dome president Minoru Hayashi. A joint venture between the two companies was formed in July 1988 by the name of Jiotto Inc. (60% held by Wacoal and 40% held by DOME) to design and build the car. The engineering was entrusted to Dome, while the newly incorporated Jiotto Design studio was tasked with designing the car.

The Caspita was displayed at the 28th Tokyo Motor Show in 1989. In light of positive reception, a limited production run of 30 units was considered, but never came to fruition. The project would die out in 1993 due to the collapse of the Japanese asset price bubble, which resulted in a lack of demand for sports cars.

The Mk. I Caspita is currently on display at the Motorcar Museum of Japan in Komatsu, whilst the Mk. II remains in possession of Dome and sits in their museum below the wind tunnel at their headquarters.

Design 
The car had a sleek and aerodynamic body design inspired by Group C race cars. Design mockups of 1/5 scale were made for wind tunnel testing. Later, full-size models were made and tested at Dome's own wind tunnel as well as the JARI (Japan Automobile Research Institute) wind tunnel for aerodynamic refinement. Jiotto Design selected three design proposals out of the initially proposed 200 for final development. Out of the three, a design having an integrated rear wing and large side air intakes was fully developed.

The Mk. II Caspita was partially restyled with new twin circular taillights, circular headlights, and more traditionally styled side-view mirrors.

Powertrain 
The Mk. After the failure of Subaru's F1 effort, the 1235 was abandoned, leaving Jiotto without an engine supplier.

The Mk.

Both engines were longitudinally mounted and coupled to a 6-speed gearbox built by Weismann.

Chassis 
The Caspita had a bonded aluminium and carbon fibre monocoque chassis made by Mitsubishi Rayon Co., Ltd. The construction technique involved sandwiching aluminium between layers of carbon fibre and curing them in an autoclave to create a rigid structure. The process was repeated 15 times over a span of more than 2 months. I Caspita.

Accessed via two gull-wing doors, the Caspita's red-and-black interior was driver-focused and spartan in nature, with no air conditioning, cruise control, or other such driver amenities; it even lacked cup holders.

Specifications (1989 Mk. I Caspita)

Dimensions

Powertrain

Performance

Other

Specifications (1990 Mk. II Caspita)

Dimensions

Engine

Performance

Other

See also
Dome Zero
Yamaha OX99-11
Aspark Owl
McLaren F1
Cizeta-Moroder V16T
Bugatti EB 110

References

Jiotto Caspita Mk II specifications
Weismann
Official Dome's Caspita page
Jiotto Caspita - Full Story

Cars powered by boxer engines
Automobiles with gull-wing doors
Cars of Japan
Dome vehicles